Jamal al Barzinji (December 15, 1939 – September 26, 2015) was an Kurdish-American businessman, associated with the International Institute of Islamic Thought, the World Assembly of Muslim Youth, and the SAAR Foundation.

He was a founder and served on the board of the Islamic Society of North America and is a past president of the Muslim Students' Association.

Background
Barzinji was listed as the successor registrant of Grover Norquist's defunct lobbying firm Janus-Merritt Strategies, after the departure of David Safavian.

On September 25, 2011 Barzinji was awarded a lifetime achievement award by the Arab community of northern Virginia at an event attended by Virginia governor Tim Kaine.

Barzinji died on September 26, 2015.

References

External links
 Virginia Public Access Project – Political Donations – Barzinji, Jamal M

American businesspeople
1939 births
2015 deaths
Iraqi Muslim activists
American Muslim activists
American people of Kurdish descent